Ildikó Balog (born 7 November 1977) is a Hungarian gymnast. She competed at the 1992 Summer Olympics and the 1996 Summer Olympics.

References

External links
 

1977 births
Living people
Hungarian female artistic gymnasts
Olympic gymnasts of Hungary
Gymnasts at the 1992 Summer Olympics
Gymnasts at the 1996 Summer Olympics
People from Békéscsaba
Sportspeople from Békés County